E. europaeus may refer to:
 Erinaceus europaeus, the European hedgehog or common hedgehog, a mammal species found in northern and western Europe
 Euonymus europaeus, the spindle, European spindle or common spindle, a deciduous shrub or small tree species

See also